Gabon's music includes several folk styles and pop. Gabonese pop artist Patience Dabany, who now lives in the US, produces albums recorded in Los Angeles with a distinctively Gabonese element; they are popular throughout Francophone Africa. Other musicians include guitarists Georges Oyendze, La Rose Mbadou and Sylvain Avara, and the singer Oliver N'Goma. Imported rock and hip hop from the US and UK are popular in Gabon, as are rumba, makossa and soukous.

National music
The national anthem of Gabon is "La Concorde", written and composed by Georges Aleka Damas and adopted in 1960 upon independence.

Traditional music
Gabon's population, estimated at 1,640,286, of whom 42% are minors (July 2013 est.), include four major Bantu groupings; the Fang, the Punu, the Nzebi and the Obamba.

Gabon, to the French ethnographer Barabe, "is to Africa what Tibet is to Asia, the spiritual center of religious initiations", due to the sacred music of the Bwiti, the dominant religious doctrine of the country, variously ascribed to the Fang and the Mitsogho, which involves the use of iboga.

Gabonese folk instruments include the obala.

Popular music

The history of modern Gabonese music did not begin until about 1974, when the blind guitarist and singer Pierre Akendengué released his first album. He was classically trained in Europe, and his compositions reflect the influence of Western classical music. Akendengue's European career started after being treated for eye disease at a hospital in Paris. He stayed, and studied at the Petit Conservatoire. By the 1970s, he was at the forefront of a wave of popular Francophone African music stars, beginning with the release of Nandipo in 1974. Akendegue was supported by Pierre Barouh, a powerful man in the French music industry, responsible for launching the careers of Brigitte Fontaine and Jacques Higelin, among others. Akendegue came to be seen as a spokesperson for the Gabonese people, and for the poor and dispossessed of all Africa. After spending twenty years in France, Akendegue returned to Gabon despite concerns over government censorship of his music. He wound up being appointed a government advisor.

The 1980s saw the formation of Africa No. 1, a radio station devoted to African music, and the opening of the first Gabonese recording studio, Studio Mademba. Musicians from across Africa and even in the Caribbean travelled to Libreville to record.

References

External links
  Audio clips: Traditional music of Gabon. Musée d'ethnographie de Genève. Accessed November 25, 2010.